Huon may refer to:
 Jean-Michel Huon de Kermadec, French explorer
 Named after him:
 Huon Gulf, large gulf in Papua New Guinea
 Huon Island, Tasmania
 Huon Peninsula, large peninsula in Papua New Guinea
 Huon Pine, species of conifer native to Tasmania
 Huon River, fourth largest river in Tasmania
 Huon Valley, local government district of Tasmania
 Port Huon, Tasmania
 Huon of Bordeaux, character from medieval chansons de geste
 King-Emperor Huon of Granbretan, a fictional character in the work of Michael Moorcock
 Huon particles, an ancient power source appearing in the Doctor Who episode "The Runaway Bride"
 , two ships and a shore base of the Royal Australian Navy
Huon, Victoria, a locality in Australia

Surnames of Breton origin